San Marzano di San Giuseppe is a town and comune in the Province of Taranto, in the Italian region of Apulia. Alongside Casalvecchio di Puglia and Chieuti, it is one of the Arbëreshë communities still existing in Apulia.

Economy is based on the cultivation of olive trees and vine.

References

Arbëresh settlements
Cities and towns in Apulia
Localities of Salento